List of male table tennis singles medalists. In the 1960 Summer Paralympics, only wheelchair users played. Standing players began to participate in the 1976 Summer Paralympics, players with cerebral palsy competed at the 1980 Summer Paralympics.

Wheelchair medalists

Standing medalists

Intellectually impaired medalists

Open singles events

See also
List of Olympic medalists in table tennis

References

Table tennis at the Summer Paralympics